Cycling at the 2000 Summer Olympics, 3 different bicycle racing disciplines were contested: Road cycling, track cycling, and mountain biking.

Road cycling

Track cycling

Men

Women

Mountain biking

Medal table

Records broken

OR = Olympic record, WR = World record

Sources

References

External links
Official Olympic Report

 
2000
2000 Summer Olympics events
Olympics